Pristimantis balionotus is a species of frog in the family Strabomantidae. It is endemic to Ecuador and only known from its type locality on the border between the Loja and Zamora-Chinchipe Provinces, near the crest of the Ecuadorian Andes. Common name crest robber frog has been coined for it.

Description
Adult males measure  (based on two males only) and females  in snout–vent length. The snout is subacuminate in dorsal and rounded in lateral profile. The tympanum is visible. The fingers and toes bear discs and lateral fringes but no webbing. Skin is dorsally tuberculate and ventrally areolate. The dorsum is dark brown with some flecks. The ventrum is dirty white and may have black flecks.

Pristimantis balionotus is similar to Pristimantis riveti and might be its geographic variant.

Habitat and conservation
Specimens have been found from terrestrial bromeliads during the daytime. It is moderately common but threatened by habitat loss and degradation caused by agricultural activities and pine plantations. It occurs in the Podocarpus National Park.

References

balionotus
Amphibians of the Andes
Amphibians of Ecuador
Endemic fauna of Ecuador
Taxa named by John Douglas Lynch
Amphibians described in 1979
Taxonomy articles created by Polbot